Kunwar Narayan (19 September 1927 – 15 November 2017) was a poet in Indian literature in Hindi. He read and traveled widely and wrote for six decades. He was linked to the New Poetry movement.

Death

He died on 15 November 2017 at the age of 90.

Works

Poetry
 Chakravyūh (Circular Siege), 1956. Radhakrishan, Delhi (first published by Rajkamal Prakashan).
 Tīsrā Saptak (Third Heptad), seven poets, ed. Agyeya, 1959. Bharatiya Jnanpith, Delhi.
 P: Hum-Tum (Surroundings: Us-You), 1961. Vani Prakashan, Delhi (first published by Bharti Bhandar, Allahabad).
 Apné Sāmné (In Front of Us), 1979. Rajkamal Prakashan, Delhi.
 Koī Dūsrā Nahīn (No One the Other), 1993. Rajkamal Prakashan, Delhi.
 In Dino (These Days), 2002. Rajkamal Prakashan, Delhi.
 Vājaśravā ke bahāne, 2008
 Hāśiye kā gavāh, 2009

Epic poems
 Ātmajayī (Self-Conqueror), based on the Upanishadic episode of Nachikétā in Kathopnishad, 1965. Bharatiya Jnanpith, Delhi.
 Vājashravā Ké Bahāné (On Vajashrava's Pretext), independent poems linked to Ātmajayī's context, 2008. Bharatiya Jnanpith.

Fiction
 Ākāron Ké Ās-Pās (Near-about Shapes), a collection of short stories, 1973. Radhakrishan Prakashan, Delhi.

Criticism
 Āj Aur Āj Sé Pahlé (Today and Before Today), 1998. Rajkamal Prakashan, Delhi.
 Méré Sākshātkār (My Interviews), interviews given by Kunwar Narain, ed. Vinod Bhardwaj, 1999. Kitabghar Prakashan, Delhi.
 Sāhitya Ké Kuchh Antar-Vishayak Sandarbh (Some Interdisciplinary Contexts of Literature), XIV Samvatsar Lecture, 2003. Sahitya Akademi.

Translations
 Selected poems of and essay on Constantine Cavafy, 'Tanāv', 1986 and Jorge-Luis Borges, 'Tanāv', 1987.
 Selected poems of Stéphane Mallarmé, Tadeusz Różewicz, Derek Walcott, Zbigniew Herbert, Anna Świrszczyńska, etc.

Compilations
 Kunwar Nārāin: Sansār-I (World: Select writings of Kunwar Narain), ed. Yatindra Mishra, 2002. Vani Prakashan, Delhi.
Kunwar Nārāin: Upasthiti-II (Presence: Select articles on Kunwar Narain and his writings), ed. Y Mishra, 2002. Vani Prakashan.
Kunwar Nārāin: Chunī Huī Kavitāyein (Selected Poems), ed. Suresh Salil, 2007. Medha Books, Delhi.
Kunwar Nārāin: Pratinidhī Kavitāyein (Representative Poems), ed. Purshottam Agarwal, 2008. Rajkamal Prakashan, Delhi.

Awards and recognition

Jnanpith Award (considered as the highest literary award in India), for overall contribution in Hindi literature, 2005
Padma Bhushan the third highest civilian award in the Republic of India for 'Literature & Education', 2009

Foreign translations

Modern Hindi Poetry: An Anthology, ed. Vidya N. Misra, 1965, Indiana Univ. Press, Bloomington & London. (English translation by Leonard Nathan & H M Guy)
Tokyo University Journal, No. 7, December 1972, Hindi Dept., Tokyo Univ. of Foreign Studies, Nishigahara, Kita-ku, Tokyo (Japanese translation by Toshio Tanaka)
Der Ochsenkarren, Hindilyrik der siebziger und achtziger Jahre, Zusammengestellt von Vishnu Khare & Lothar Lutze, Verlag Wolf Mersch, 1983 (German transl.)
Kunvar Narayan, Naciketa, A cura di Mariola Offredi, Plural Edizioni, Napoli. Collezione di Poesia I Cristalli, 1989, (Italian translation of Atmajayee)
The Golden Waist Chain: Modern Hindi Short Stories, ed. Sara Rai, 1990, Penguin. (English translation by Sara Rai)
TriQuarterly 77, Winter 1989/90, ed. Reginald Gibbons, 1990, Northwestern University, US (English translation by Vinay Dharwadker)
Periplus: Poetry in Translation, eds. Daniel Weissbort & Arvind K. Mehrotra, 1993, Oxford Univ. Press. (English translations by Daniel Weissbort & the poet)
The Penguin New Writing in India, eds. Aditya Behl & David Nicholls, 1994, Penguin India, First published by Chicago Review (Vol. 38, Nos1 & 2), 1992
Survival, eds. Daniel Weissbort & Girdhar Rathi. Sahitya Akademi, India, 1994 (English translations by Daniel Weissbort & the poet)
The Oxford Anthology of Modern Indian Poetry, eds. Vinay Dharwadker & A.K. Ramanujan, 1994, Oxford University Press (English translations)
Yatra 2: Writings from The Indian Subcontinent, General Ed.: Alok Bhalla, Eds. Nirmal Verma & U R Ananthamurthy, 1994, Indus (English trans., Alok Bhalla)
Living Literature: A Trilingual Documentation of Indo-German Literary Exchange, eds. Barbara Lotz and Vishnu Khare (German translations)
Gestures: Poetry from SAARC Countries, Edited by K. Satchidanandan, 1996 (Reprint 2001), Sahitya Akademi, India (English)
An Anthology of Modern Hindi Poetry, ed. Kailash Vajpeyi, 1998, Rupa & Co., India (English translations)
Dilli Mein Kavita, ed. Kailash Vajpeyi, translated into Russian by Varyam Singh, 1999, Sahitya Kala Parishad, Delhi (Russian translations)
Poeti Hindi: Antologia del Novecento, A cura di Mariola Offredi, Casta Diva, Roma. 2000. Poesia, Collana diretta da Enrico D’Angelo (Italian translations)
Kunvar Narayan, Nessuno è altro, A cura di Roberta Sequi, Casta Diva, Roma. 2001. (Italian translation of Koee Doosra Nahin)
Beyond Borders: An Anthology of SAARC Poetry, eds. Ashok Vajpeyi & Ajeet Cour, 2002, Academy of Fine Arts and Literature & Rainbow Publishers.
Ze współczesnej poezji Hindi, Przegląd Orientalistyczny, vol. 202-203, no. 3-4, Warszawa, 2002, translated by Danuta Stasik. (Polish translations)
Hindi: Handpicked Fictions, Edited and translated by Sara Rai, 2003, Katha, Delhi. (English translations)
New Poetry in Hindi (Nayi Kavita): An anthology edited, translated and introduced by Lucy Rosenstein, 2003, Permanent Black, Delhi. (English translations)
Cracow Indological Studies Vol. 6, ed. Renata Czekalska, Jagiellonian Univ., Kraków, 2005. (Polish translations, Renata Czekalska & Agnieszka Kuczkiewicz-Fraś)
Kunwar Narain, Varco di ombre, a cura di Tullia Baldassarri Höger von Högersthal, edizione Mura, 2006 (Italian translation of selected poems)
Ik zag de stad, Moderne Hindi-poëzie, Vertaald en ingeleid door Lodewijk Brunt & Dick Plukker, Stichting India Instituut, Amsterdam, 2006 (Dutch translation)
Teaching on India in Central and Eastern Europe, eds. Danuta Stasik & Anna Trynkowska, Warsaw, 2007 (Polish translations by Danuta Stasik)
Kunwar Narain, Przez Słowa, Antologia pod redakcją Renaty Czekalskiej i Agnieszki Kuczkiewicz-Fraś, Księgarnia Akademicka, Kraków, 2007 (Polish translation)
Kunwar Narain. No Other World: Selected Poems, translated by Apurva Narain, Rupa & Co., India, 2008. (English translation)
Kunwar Narajan. Wiersze, w przekładzie Danuty Stasik, DIALOG, Warszawa 2013 (Polish translation)

References

1927 births
2017 deaths
Hindi-language writers
Hindi-language poets
Writers from Lucknow
Writers from Delhi
University of Lucknow alumni
Recipients of the Jnanpith Award
People from Faizabad district
Recipients of the Padma Bhushan in literature & education
20th-century Indian translators
Poets from Uttar Pradesh
20th-century Indian poets
Recipients of the Sahitya Akademi Award in Hindi